Veslački Klub Partizan is a Serbian rowing club from Belgrade. The club is part of the sports society JSD Partizan, and is also a member of the Serbian Rowing Federation.

The club's main headquarters are on the small island Ada Ciganlija.

History
The club was founded on July 5, 1951, by a group of young army officers and former rowers. The club was based on Ada Ciganlija, where it is to this day. 
The club's facilities were built by German prisoners of war. The facility, built from concrete, is often threatened by flooding, the worst case being in 1981 when the level of water inside reached .

In 1986, at the suggestion of club president Danka Đunića, the administration of the club was professionalized, and former Serbian national team rowers and VKP members Nebojša Ilić and Dušan Kovačević were hired as coaches, and Mile Jokić as secretary. This represented a turning point in the history of the club. In the same year, above the space where the caretaker's apartment is located, a space was added in which the club offices are located.

In 1990, Slobodan Stojiljković was hired as director of the club, after which VKP initiated a longterm renovation project. From 1990 to 2007, with the support of donors, sponsors, the community, and the supporters of JSD Partizan, a number of projects were completed, including: an embankment and drainage system; a new sewer system; a renovation of the office space, which have at times been used as offices for the rowing federations of Yugoslavia, Serbia, and Belgrade; a boat repair workshop; a new roof; steam heating; and a fitness and spa center known as "Masters Rowing Club Partizan."

Thanks in part to these works, the club has been, since 1995, a highly successful elite rowing club. VKP athletes have won medals at the World Championships and the European Championships and competed at the Olympic Games. VKP youth athletes have gone on to elite American university rowing programs, including the University of California, Berkeley, and the University of Pennsylvania. VKP is the most successful rowing club in Serbia.

References

External links 
Official Website

Sport in Belgrade
Sports clubs established in 1951
1951 establishments in Yugoslavia